Mangaluru Central railway station, formerly Mangalore Central railway station (Station code: MAQ) is the main railway terminus in the city of Mangalore. It is one of the major railway stations in Karnataka state and it is the biggest terminal station under Palakkad railway division. There is also another railway station named Mangalore Junction railway station, previously known as Kankanady railway station. The Mangalore region provides the highest freight revenue to the Palakkad division, which sums up to 90 percent of the total revenue which the Palakkad division generates. Mangalore Central comes under the Southern Railway and also provides connectivity for Konkan Railway and South Western Railway of the Indian Railways. It is one of the 5 central railway stations of India.

Location
Mangalore Central railway station is located at Old Kent road, Hampankatta. The other major railway station in the city, Mangalore Junction located at Darbar Hill, Padil, Mangalore 575007.

Background
Rail connectivity in Mangalore was established in 1907. A metre-gauge railway track, built through the Western Ghats, connected Mangalore with Hassan. The metre-gauge track was converted to a broad-gauge track connecting Mangalore to Bangalore via Hassan. The re-gauged track was opened to freight traffic in May 2006 and passenger traffic in December 2007. The track network in the Mangalore area is based on a triangular pattern, with Mangalore Central, Mangalore Junction and the Netravati River railway bridge at the vertices of the triangle.

A railway siding leads from Mangalore Central to the historic old Railway Goods-Shed in the old Port, Bunder area of Mangalore city. For a year 1929–1930 the longest running train in undivided India originated from Mangalore Central. This was the Grand Trunk Express from Mangalore to Peshawar. The train covered the distance from Mangalore to Peshawar on the Khyber Pass in 104 hours. After 1930 the route of the Grand Trunk Express was curtailed and the train originated from Mettupalayam, Coimbatore.

Services
Trains from here connect the city to prominent state capitals of India like Chennai, Bangalore, Hyderabad, Thiruvananthapuram (via Southern Railway), Mumbai, Thane, Delhi, Ajmer, Ahmedabad (via Konkan Railways) and so forth. It is also well connected with Mysore, Ratnagiri (Maharashtra), Madgoan (Goa), Byndur Mookambika road,  Udupi, Kannur, Ernakulam and Coimbatore (Tamil Nadu)railway stations.

See also
 Surathkal railway station
 Thokur railway station
 Mangalore Mail

References

External links

Railway terminus in India
Transport in Mangalore
Buildings and structures in Mangalore
Railway stations in Dakshina Kannada district
Railway stations opened in 1907
Railway centrals in India
Railway stations along Konkan Railway line
Palakkad railway division